Lion Bear Fox (also sometimes stylized as The Lion The Bear The Fox or LBF) is a Canadian folk rock band from British Columbia. The band was formed in May 2012 by singer-songwriters Christopher Arruda of Nanaimo, British Columbia, Cory Woodward of Vancouver, British Columbia, and Ryan McMahon of Ladysmith, British Columbia.
In 2013, the lion the bear the fox was named a Top 20 finalist in 102.7 The Peak FM’s Peak Performance Project and released its debut self-produced EP, We’d Be Good Men.  In February 2017, LBF released its self-titled debut "Lion Bear Fox."

Career

Formation 
The lion the bear the fox formed after Christopher Arruda, Cory Woodward and Ryan McMahon toured together in 2012 as solo artists.
They started joining in on each other’s songs after an impromptu show in Winnipeg.
“I know I certainly had no interest in starting a band previous to going on the road with these two, but the events of the tour were something that couldn’t be ignored,” said Arruda.
Combined, the singer-songwriters have three decades experience between them. “All three of us gents have been at this for over 10 years apiece, and I think that for some reason the timing was right,” said McMahon. “I believe that in many ways, we were all up in arms about our solo missions, and we all happened to join together at a very critical time. Instead of ‘I give up,’ it was like ‘Man, can you help me?’”

Recording and touring 
Since forming, the lion the bear the fox has shared the stage with artists such as Lee Harvey Osmond, Elliott BROOD, Kim Mitchell and The Steel Wheels.

“When we perform, people experience three powerful, honest and soulful voices that will take them on a roller coaster ride of dynamically pleasing songs,” said Woodward. “Each one’s a journey, and we welcome everyone with open arms to dance wild, scream and sing into the night and experience one of the greatest self-made gifts we can give ourselves – pure uninhibited joy.”

The lion the bear the fox released its debut EP, We’d Be Good Men, 8 October 2013. Featuring six originals and a cover of Ray LaMontagne’s “Henry Nearly Killed Me (It’s A Shame),” the album was produced and mixed by Arruda and Woodward and mastered by 2013 Juno Award nominee Joby Baker of Victoria.

“I love that we’ve had the opportunity to do it this way,” said Woodward. “It gave us the chance to do some guerilla-style recording in the 30-odd locations that we set up shop to track in. I’ve learned so much about common recording techniques and have had a blast creating my own. All of this has added a certain honesty to the record, a lovability that has made me happy to say it’s the best record I’ve been a part of to date. I look forward to the next one immensely.”

Members 
 The Lion: Christopher Arruda - vocals, organ, percussion
 The Bear: Cory Woodward - vocals, guitar, bass, percussion
 The Fox: Ryan McMahon - vocals, guitar, percussion

The Bandwagon Project 
In fall 2013 LBF entered into a partnership with the Vancouver, British Columbia-based charitable foundation Music Heals to raise funding for the Bandwagon Project. The project draws its name from a mobile recording studio named the Bandwagon, which is specifically designed for music therapists to use with critically and terminally ill patients. Items used in the Bandwagon include microphones, instruments, a computer, and recording software. Funds raised would allow for the band to bring the studio to Vancouver Island hospitals for the first time.
The project was inspired by Megan McNeil from North Delta, British Columbia, adrenal cancer patient that had been battling the disease since she was 16 before passing away at 20 years of age. McNeil wrote a song called The Will to Survive as a tribute to other children fighting cancer, and McMahon helped McNeil arrange and record her song in 2010. Of McNeil's influence on the project, McMahon stated that "Megan’s Will to Survive song, video and entire campaign wouldn’t have seen the light if not for music therapy".  Currently there is one stationary Bandwagon at B.C. Children’s Hospital and one that travels around Greater Vancouver for six-week residencies.

Discography 
 We'd Be Good Men (2013)
 Lion Bear Fox (2017)

References

External links 
 
 The Bandwagon Project

2012 establishments in British Columbia
Canadian folk rock groups
Musical groups established in 2012
Musical groups from British Columbia